Ubiquilin-1 is a protein that in humans is encoded by the UBQLN1 gene.
 
Ubiquilins contain two domains, an N-terminal ubiquitin-like domain and a C-terminal ubiquitin-associated domain. They physically associate with both proteasomes and ubiquitin ligases, and thus are thought to functionally link the ubiquitination machinery to the proteasome to effect in vivo protein degradation.

Functions
Ubiquilin-1 is associated with protein degradation and aggregation of misfolded proteins, and may be involved in neurodegenerative diseases. Ubiquilin-1 has been reported to act as a molecular chaperone for amyloid precursor protein (APP), a protein associated with Alzheimer's disease. 

Ubiquilin-1 was first identified through its interactions with presenilins. Two transcript variants encoding different isoforms have been found for this gene.

Related proteins

Human UBQLN1 shares a high degree of similarity with related ubiquilins including UBQLN2 and UBQLN4.

Interactions 

UBQLN1 has been shown to interact with

 HERPUD1,
 MTOR,
 P4HB,
 PSEN1
 PSEN2, and
 UBE3A.
 TMCO6,

References

Further reading